Hervé Jacquet is a French American mathematician, working in automorphic forms. He is considered one of the founders of the theory of automorphic representations and their associated L-functions, and his results play a central role in modern number theory.

Career
Jacquet entered the École Normale Supérieure in 1959 and obtained his doctorat d'état under the direction of Roger Godement in 1967. He held academic positions at the Centre National de la Recherche Scientifique (1963–1969), the Institute for Advanced Study in Princeton (1967–1969), the University of Maryland at College Park (1969–1970), the Graduate Center of the City University of New York (1970–1974), and became a professor at Columbia University in 1974, becoming Professor Emeritus in 2007.

Mathematical work
It presented a representation theory of automorphic forms and their associated L−functions for the general linear group , establishing among other things the Jacquet–Langlands correspondence which explains very precisely how automorphic forms for  relate to those for quaternion algebras.

A basic ingredient of this effort was an elaboration of properties of Whittaker models and functions, which Jacquet had made contributions to since his thesis.

In the mid-1980s, Jacquet forayed into a new territory in the field and created the relative trace formula in representation theory, an important tool in modern number theory, which vastly generalizes the Kuznetsov and Petersson formulae from the classical setup. While the usual Selberg trace formula, as well as its generalizations due to James Arthur, consists in developing an expression for the integral of the kernel over the diagonal, the relative version integrates the kernel over other appropriate subgroups.

Awards and honors
He was elected corresponding member of the Académie des Sciences in 1980. In 2012 he became a fellow of the American Mathematical Society. He was elected to the American Academy of Arts and Sciences in 2013.

See also
Jacquet module

References

External links
Columbia University Faculty Bio
 

1939 births
Living people
École Normale Supérieure alumni
20th-century French mathematicians
Number theorists
Columbia University faculty
Members of the French Academy of Sciences
Fellows of the American Mathematical Society
Fellows of the American Academy of Arts and Sciences